Nuestra Belleza Durango 2011, was held in the 2,200-seat Teatro Ricardo Castro opera house in Durango, Durango on June 9, 2011. At the conclusion of the final night of competition, Mónica I. Ayala Venegas of Durango City was crowned the winner. Ayala was crowned by outgoing Nuestra Belleza Durango titleholder, Vanessa Crispín. Eight contestants competed for the title.

Results

Placements

Special awards

Judges
Carmen Saláis - Fashion Business
María Eleneca Castaños - Director of International Affairs of the State
Sonia García Calderón - Businesswoman
Bella Vieira - Event Producer Televisa México
Mario Sánchez Patiño - Director of Corporate Image Design
Yima Medrano - Photographer
Mariano Herrera - Representative of Magazine Soy Norte
Patricia Brogeras - Regional Coordinator of Nuestra Belleza México

Contestants

References

External links
Official Website

Nuestra Belleza México